Joshua Svaty (born November 7, 1979) is an American politician, farmer, and businessman from Kansas. He announced his bid for the 2018 Kansas gubernatorial election as a Democrat on May 16, 2017. In 2002, at the age of 22, Svaty was elected to the Kansas House of Representatives and served until he was appointed secretary of the Kansas Department of Agriculture by Governor Mark Parkinson on July 14, 2009. After leaving office in 2011, Svaty served as the Vice President of The Land Institute, a nonprofit agricultural research entity near Salina. He and his wife own a farm in Ellsworth County, Kansas.

Education 
Svaty received his undergraduate degree from Sterling College, a small liberal arts college in Sterling, Kansas. He later attended Washburn University School of Law in Topeka, Kansas, partly during his term in the Kansas House of Representatives.

Career

Campaign for Governor 

Since announcing he was running for Governor of Kansas in May 2017, Svaty visited all 105 Kansas counties as part of his campaign trail, traveling over 16,701 miles and counting.

In May 2018, Svaty announced his running mate for lieutenant governor to be Katrina Lewison, a Manhattan-Ogden USD 383 Board of Education member and former Blackhawk helicopter pilot.

House of Representatives 
Svaty was first elected to the Kansas House of Representatives at the age of 22. Svaty started his term on January 8, 2003 as a representative of the 108th district, which consisted of Ellsworth County, rural Saline County, parts of south Salina, and Solomon in Dickinson County. Svaty, a member of the Democratic Party, was elected in a district in which the Republican Party held a 2-to-1 registration advantage. He was re-elected to his House seat three times.

Committee membership 
 Energy and Utilities
 Agriculture and Natural Resources (Ranking Member)
 Joint Committee on Energy and Environmental Policy

Major donors 
The top 5 donors to Svaty's 2008 campaign:   
1. AT&T $1,500
2. Kansas National Education Assoc $1,000
3. Kansas Medical Society $1,000
4. Kansas Contractors Assoc $1,000
5. Pioneer Communications $1,000

Secretary of Agriculture 
Governor Mark Parkinson appointed Svaty as the Kansas Secretary of Agriculture in 2009. He served in this role from 2009-2011.

EPA 
Svaty served as senior advisor to the regional administrator for the Environmental Protection Agency’s Region 7 for more than two years, following his time as the Secretary of Agriculture.

The Land Institute 
Svaty served as the vice president of The Land Institute, a science-based research organization based in Saline County that is working on developing perennial grain crops, before he returned to farming in Ellsworth County. He left The Land Institute in 2015 to focus fully on Free State Farms.

Free State Farms 
Svaty and his wife, Kimberly, own and operate Free State Farms, a crop and livestock operation in Ellsworth County. Free State Farms was formed in 2010 and is a fully diversified operation that includes wheat, sorghum, soybeans, sunflowers, and a cow/calf operation.

References

External links 
 Campaign website
 Kansas Department of Agriculture
 Project Vote Smart profile
 Kansas Votes profile
 State Surge - Legislative and voting track record
 Campaign contributions: 2002, 2004, 2008

1979 births
Kansas lawyers
Kansas Secretaries of Agriculture
Living people
Democratic Party members of the Kansas House of Representatives
People from Ellsworth, Kansas
Washburn University alumni
21st-century American lawyers
21st-century American politicians
Sterling College alumni
Candidates in the 2018 United States elections